is the eighth studio album by Japanese idol girl group AKB48, released on 25 January 2017. This album features the singles "Kuchibiru ni Be My Baby", "High Tension", as well as "365 Nichi no Kamihikouki", the main theme from NHK's Asadora series, Asa ga Kita. This is the last album to feature long-time member and former AKB48 Team A Haruna Kojima.

Track listing

Personnel 
Graduated Members
 Haruka Shimazaki
 Minami Takahashi 
 Yuko Oshima 
 Atsuko Maeda 
 Tomomi Itano 
 Mariko Shinoda 

Guests
 Morning Musume '17 
 Junichi Inagaki

Release history

References 

AKB48 albums
2017 albums
Japanese-language albums